Đạ Huoai is a rural district of Lâm Đồng province in the Central Highlands region of Vietnam. As of 2003 the district had a population of 34,039. The district covers an area of 490 km². The district capital lies at Ma Đa Guôi.

References

Districts of Lâm Đồng province